The Book of Rites, also known as the Liji, is a collection of texts describing the social forms, administration, and ceremonial rites of the Zhou dynasty as they were understood in the Warring States and the early Han periods. The Book of Rites, along with the Rites of Zhou (Zhōulǐ) and the Book of Etiquette and Rites (Yílǐ), which are together known as the "Three Li (Sānlǐ)," constitute the ritual (lǐ) section of the Five Classics which lay at the core of the traditional Confucian canon (each of the "five" classics is a group of works rather than a single text). As a core text of the Confucian canon, it is also known as the Classic of Rites or Lijing, which some scholars believe was the original title before it was changed by Dai Sheng.

History 
The Book of Rites is a diverse collection of texts of uncertain origin and date that lacks the overall structure found in the other "rites" texts (the Rites of Zhou and the Etiquette and Ceremonial).  Some sections consist of definitions of ritual terms, particularly those found in the Etiquette and Ceremonial, while others contain details of the life and teachings of Confucius.  Parts of the text have been traced to such pre-Han works as the Xunzi and Lüshi Chunqiu, while others are believed to date from the Former Han period.

During the reign of Qin Shihuang, many of the Confucian classics were destroyed during the 213 BC "Burning of the Books." However, the Qin dynasty collapsed within the decade and Confucian scholars who had memorized the classics or hid written copies recompiled them in the early Han dynasty. The Book of Rites was said to have been fully reconstructed, but the Classic of Music could not be recompiled and fragments principally survive in the "Record of Music" (Yueji) chapter of the Book of Rites.

Since then, other scholars have attempted to redact these first drafts. According to the Book of Sui, Dai De reworked the text in the 1st century BC, reducing the original 214 books to 85 in the "Ritual Records of Dai the Elder", his nephew Dai Sheng further reduced this to 46 books in the "Ritual Records of Dai the Younger", and finally Ma Rong added three books to this bringing the total to 49. Later scholarship has disputed the Book of Sui'''s account as there is no reliable evidence to attribute these revisions to either Dai De or Dai Sheng, although both of them were Confucian scholars specialising in various texts concerning li. Nevertheless, at this time these texts were still being edited, with new script and old script versions circulating, and the content not yet fixed. However, when Zheng Xuan, a student of Ma Rong, composed his annotated text of the Rites he combined all of the traditions of ritual learning to create a fixed edition of the 49 books which are the standard to this day. Zheng Xuan's annotated edition of the Rites became the basis of the "Right Meaning of the Ritual Records" which was the imperially authorised text and commentary on the Rites established in 653 AD.

In 1993, a copy of the "Black Robes" chapter was found in Tomb 1 of the Guodian Tombs in Jingmen, Hubei. Since the tomb was sealed around 300 BCE, the find reactivated academic arguments about the possible dating of the other Liji chapters by the Warring States period.

Li

Confucius described Li as all traditional forms that provided a standard of conduct. Li literally means "rites" but it can also be used to refer to "ceremonial" or "rules of conduct". The term has come to generally be associated with "good form", "decorum" or "politeness". Confucius felt that li should emphasize the spirit of piety and respect for others through rules of conduct and ceremonies. As outlined in the Book of Rites, li is meant to restore the significance of traditional forms by looking at the simplicity of the past. Confucius insisted that a standard of conduct that focused on traditional forms would be a way to ease the turmoil of collapsing Zhou state. The absolute power of li is displayed in the Book of Rites: "Of all things to which the people owe their lives the rites are the most important..." The ideas of li were thought to become closely associated with human nature, ethics, and social order as the population integrated li into their lives. Li is beneficial to society because it guides people to recognize and fulfill their responsibilities toward others.

 Legacy 
As a result of the Book of Rites' chapters, using a syncretic system later scholars formed both the Great Learning and the Doctrine of the Mean.  These two books were both believed to be written by two of Confucius' disciples one specifically being his grandson.  The Neo-Confucian Zhu Xi and his edited versions of the Great Learning and the Doctrine of the Mean influenced the Chinese society to place much more attention on these and two other books creating the Four Books.  Following the decision of the Yuan dynasty (followed by the Ming and Qing) to make the Five Classics and the Four Books the orthodox texts of the Confucian traditions, they were the standard textbooks for the state civil examination, from 1313 to 1905, which every educated person had to study intensively.  Consequently, the Book of Rites and two of its by-products were large integral parts of the Chinese beliefs and industry for many centuries.

Contents

Translations
  Legge, James (1885).  Sacred Books of the East, volumes 27 and 28.  Oxford: Oxford University Press. [complete translation]
  J. M. Callery (1853).  Li-Ki, ou Mémorial des rites, traduit pour la première fois du chinois et accompagné de notes, de commentaires et du texte original [Li-Ki, or Memorial of Rites, translated for the first time from Chinese and accompanied by notes, comments and the original text] . Paris: Imprimerie Royale, Benjamin Duprat, librairie de l'institut. [incomplete translation]
  Couvreur, Séraphin (1913).  Li Ki, ou Mémoires sur les bienséances; texte Chinois avec une double traduction en Francais et en Latin [Li Ji, or Dissertation on Proprieties; Chinese text with a double translation in French and Latin], volumes 1 and 2. Hokkien: Mission Catholique.
   [complete translation]

 References 

 Bibliography 
 Buckley Ebrey, Patricia. Confucianism and the Family Rituals in Imperial China. New Jersey: Princeton University Press, 1991, 
 Chen, Jingpan. Confucius as a Teacher. Beijing: Foreign Languages Press, 1990, 
 Confucius; James Legge; Chʻu Chai; Winberg Chai. Li Chi: Book of Rites. An encyclopedia of ancient ceremonial usages, religious creeds, and social institutions, New Hyde Park, N.Y., University Books [1967]. (originally published in 1885)
 Creel, H.G. Confucius and the Chinese Way. New York: Harper & Row, Publishers, 1949
 
 de Bary, Wm. Theodore, Wing-tsit Chan, and  Buton Watson. Sources of Chinese Tradition. New York and London: Columbia University Press, 1960, 
 Holm, Jean, and John Bowker. Sacred Writings. London: Printer Publishers Ltd., 1994
 Lin Yutang. The Wisdom of Confucius. New York: Random House, Inc., 1938
 
 Puett, Michael. "Centering the Realm: Wang Mang, the Zhouli, and Early Chinese Statecraft." in Elman, Benjamin A. and Kern, Martin, eds., Statecraft and Classical Learning: the Rituals of Zhou in East Asian History, pp.129-154.
 
 Smith, Howard. Confucius. Great Britain: Charles Scribner's Sons, 1973

 External links 

 The Book of Rites (Chinese and English, James Legge's 1885 translation) - Chinese Text Project
 Confucian Documents (English)
 Liji 禮記 The Book of Rites, Ulrich Theobald, Chinese Literature'', 24 July 2010.

Chinese classic texts
Confucian texts
Four Books and Five Classics
Thirteen Classics
Confucian rites